Magnolia Park is an area of the East End, Houston, Texas, located near the Houston Ship Channel. One of the oldest Hispanic neighborhoods in the City of Houston, Magnolia Park was formerly incorporated as the City of Magnolia Park in eastern Harris County.

History

The plot was owned by Thomas M. Brady, and the community was named for the 3,750 magnolias planted by developers. The Magnolia Park community was organized in 1909. The city incorporated in 1913, even having its own police force. 

Magnolia Park originally had non-Hispanic White Americans. Mexican-Americans from South Texas started to settle in Magnolia Park in 1911. By the 1920s, many Mexicans fleeing the Mexican Revolution settled in Magnolia Park. The construction of the Houston Ship Channel and area industries attracted Mexicans. They worked in different fields depending on their gender, with women working in factories, stores, and textile plants and men in working in industries such as construction and maintenance of the Ship Channel, cotton compresses and cement plants.

Canal Street in Magnolia Park was originally known as "German Street." Circa 1918 it was renamed "Belgium Street" in honor of a country invaded by Germany in World War I. At a later point the name was harmonized with that of the section in the pre-merger City of Houston, known as Canal Street.

Magnolia Park was annexed to Houston in October 1926. The Mexican community stayed centered in Magnolia Park partly due to discrimination from elements of the Anglo community. By 1926 Magnolia Park was called "Little Mexico" by Anglo residents of Houston. Its business district had businesses such as restaurants, grocery stores, barber shops, bakeries, drugstores, and gasoline stations. By 1929 it was the largest Mexican settlement in Houston.

A League of United Latin American Citizens (LULAC) branch was organized in 1934. In 1935 a Ladies LULAC council was organized. By the 1930s political organizations such as the Club Femenino-Chapultepec had been established to protest segregation, promote Mexican-American culture, and provide recreation. By the World War II period Magnolia Park was considered to be within the East End. Due to the war, Mexican-Americans in the Southwestern United States were drawn to Houston for jobs, and so the local population increased. By the time of World War II youth gangs were active in Magnolia Park.

By the 1960s most Mexican-Americans in Magnolia Park were poor, and the middle class in Magnolia Park had expanded due to programs established by President of the United States Lyndon Baines Johnson. The Magnolia Park YWCA's women hosted the Conferencia de Mujeres por la Raza in 1971. The percentage of the residents below the poverty line in 1978 was up to 20%.  When the 1980s oil bust occurred, fifty factories in and around Magnolia Park closed due to the drop in oil prices, causing thousands of Mexicans to lose their jobs. Magnolia Park had 14,000 residents in 1990. The Magnolia Park community celebrated the neighborhood's 100 year anniversary on Saturday October 17, 2009.

Many of the Historical Buildings are still there and can be seen throughout all of Harrisburg and Canal St.

Cityscape

In the 1920s the surrounding area had factories, industrial plants, refineries, textile mills, and wharves, giving employment opportunities to area residents.

During the period including the 1950s and 1960s, writer Sigman Byrd wrote about the intersection of 75th Street (nicknamed "Six-Bit Street") and Canal Street; Byrd reported that a local had called Canal "Canine Street" because the environment was "dog-eat-dog."

Government and infrastructure
Magnolia Park is in Houston City Council District I.

The City of Houston operates the Magnolia Multi-Service Center.

The Harris Health System (formerly Harris County Hospital District) designated the Ripley Health Center for the ZIP codes 77011 and 77012. In 2000 Ripley was replaced by the Gulfgate Health Center. The designated public hospital is Ben Taub General Hospital in the Texas Medical Center.

Demographics
In 2015 the City of Houston-defined Magnolia Park Super Neighborhood had 16,999 residents. 95% were Hispanic, 3% were non-Hispanic white, and 1% was non-Hispanic black. The percentages of non-Hispanic Asians and others were both zero. In 2000 the super neighborhood had 21,302 residents. 96% were Hispanic, 3% were non-Hispanic white, and 1% was non-Hispanic black. The percentages of non-Hispanic Asians and others were both zero.

Media
In the 1970s Papel Chicano, a newspaper that reported on activism in the Houston area, had its offices in Magnolia Park.

Education

Residents are zoned to Houston ISD schools.

Sections of Magnolia Park are zoned to the following elementary schools: Burnet, Briscoe, DeZavala, Franklin, Gallegos, Tijerina, and Edna M. Carrillo (outside of Magnolia Park).

All of Magnolia Park is zoned to Edison Middle School. Some of Magnolia Park is zoned to Milby High School. Some of Magnolia Park is zoned to Austin High School.

History of education
Originally the area was within the Harrisburg Independent School District. Park Junior High School opened on December 14, 1925.

A school named after Lorenzo De Zavala was first established in 1926, becoming the first ethnic Mexican majority school in Houston. In Houston Mexican students by law attended schools designated for Anglo Whites, but the school district opened De Zavala Elementary since area Anglo White parents felt concerned by the rise of the number of ethnic Mexican students in the area. In 1927 the school had 576 enrolled students. Circa the 1920s the administrators, who were Anglo Whites, enacted rules prohibiting students from speaking Spanish on the school property.

In 1930 a private school called Escuela Mexicana Hidalgo ("Hidalgo Mexican School") was established. Its goal was to preserve Mexican culture.

In February 1932 Park was renamed after Thomas Edison. Before 2000, Furr High School served much of Magnolia Park. Prior to 1997 residents zoned to Furr also had the option to attend Austin and Milby high schools; in 1997 the school district canceled the option.

Culture
According to Stephen Fox, who specializes in the history of architecture, this is the city's first ethnic Mexican-oriented public building not made for religious purposes. Due to financial problems during the Great Depression the society no longer managed the building after 1932. After multiple changes in ownership, the physical plant began to suffer from maintenance issues in the 1980s and 1990s because the old roof was removed but a new roof was not put on it. Because the owner had not paid $20,000 in back taxes, the building was to be sold in a July 6, 2004 auction, but the taxes were paid before the auction occurred, so the owner kept the property. The Greater Houston Preservation Alliance classified it as an endangered building.

Gallery

Notable residents

 Texas Senator Mario Gallegos

See also

 History of the Mexican-Americans in Houston

References
  - Profile
 Rodriguez, Nestor. "Hispanic and Asian Immigration Waves in Houston." in: Chafetz, Janet Salzman and Helen Rose Ebaugh (editors). Religion and the New Immigrants: Continuities and Adaptations in Immigrant Congregations. AltaMira Press, October 18, 2000. , 9780759117129.
 Also available in: Ebaugh, Helen Rose Fuchs and Janet Saltzman Chafetz (editors). Religion and the New Immigrants: Continuities and Adaptations in Immigrant Congregations. Rowman & Littlefield, January 1, 2000. 0742503909, 9780742503908.

Notes

External links
 Handbook of Texas Online article
 Houston HOPE section on Magnolia Park
 "Magnolia Park Super Neighborhood Community Health Profile." City of Houston. (Archive." City of Houston. (Archive)

Neighborhoods in Houston
Former cities in Texas
Mexican-American history
East End, Houston